This is a list of islands in the Caribbean by area. (The Bahamas and the Turks and Caicos Islands are not in the Caribbean Sea, but rather in the open North Atlantic Ocean.)  For related lists, see below.

Islands

Islands  and greater

Islands

Islands

Islands

Islands

Islands

See also
List of islands in the Caribbean
List of Caribbean island countries by population
List of Caribbean islands by political affiliation
List of metropolitan areas in the West Indies
List of West Indian First-level Subdivisions

References

 
 
 
 USGS

 Area
Islands By Area
Caribbean
Caribbean
West Indies
Atlantic Ocean-related lists